Aechmea alegrensis is a plant species in the genus Aechmea. It is endemic to the State of Espírito Santo in Brazil.

References

alegrensis
Flora of Brazil
Plants described in 1986